The Veterans Museum and Memorial Center is a museum located in historic Balboa Park of San Diego, California. Founded in 1989, it is dedicated to create, maintain, and operate an institution to honor and perpetuate the memories of all men and women who have served in the Armed Forces of the United States of America.  The museum currently resides in the former Chapel of the Old Balboa Naval Hospital.

References

External links 

 Official web site

Military and war museums in California
Balboa Park (San Diego)
Museums established in 1989
Museums in San Diego
1989 establishments in California